Dinopelma is a genus of ground beetles in the family Carabidae. There are about 13 described species in Dinopelma.

Species
These 13 species belong to the genus Dinopelma:
 Dinopelma angustum Andrewes, 1931  (Borneo and Indonesia)
 Dinopelma bouchardi (Pouillaude, 1914)  (Borneo, India, Indonesia, and Myanmar)
 Dinopelma immaculatum Andrewes, 1932  (Borneo and Indonesia)
 Dinopelma intermedium Louwerens, 1958  (Borneo and Indonesia)
 Dinopelma leptaleum Andrewes, 1932  (Myanmar and Thailand)
 Dinopelma lineola Andrewes, 1932  (Borneo, Indonesia, and Philippines)
 Dinopelma lunifer Andrewes, 1932  (Malaysia)
 Dinopelma marginatum Andrewes, 1932  (Philippines)
 Dinopelma minus Liebke, 1931  (Borneo and Indonesia)
 Dinopelma plantigradum Bates, 1889  (Borneo and Indonesia)
 Dinopelma quadratum Andrewes, 1931  (Borneo and Indonesia)
 Dinopelma virens (Andrewes, 1929)  (Indonesia)
 Dinopelma wegneri Louwerens, 1958  (Borneo and Indonesia)

References

Ctenodactylinae